State Route 123 (SR 123) is a short  state highway in the eastern part of the U.S. state of  Georgia. It travels through portions of Glascock and Warren counties. Its routing is entirely northwest of Mitchell.

Route description
SR 123 begins in at an intersection with SR 102 in Mitchell, within Glascock County. It heads northwest along local roads until it curves along the Glascock–Warren county line until branching north onto Shoals Road. SR 123 heads north along Shoals Road for a few miles before meeting its northern terminus, an intersection with SR 16.

Major intersections

See also

References

External links

 Georgia Roads (Routes 121 - 140)
 Georgia State Route 123 on State-Ends.com

123
Transportation in Glascock County, Georgia
Transportation in Warren County, Georgia